Anne Garber (1947 – 17 July 2011) was a Canadian journalist, restaurant critic, food and travel writer. Garber's media career spanned 44 years in print and electronic media. She was the author or co-author of 14 books on travel, bargains, access and food, and, with editor John T.D. Keyes (her husband), wrote food and travel features for magazines such as Grocer Today, Canadian Living, Chatelaine, Porthole and NUVO.

Garber wrote occasional pieces for The Vancouver Sun and The Globe and Mail, and she also contributed online to travellady.com. She was the managing director of the food-travel-entertainment site, evalu8.org. She wrote a weekly column for TV Week Magazine called "The Bargain Hunter".

Together with John Keyes, Garber co-authored the books Victoria's Best Bargains and Exploring Ethnic Vancouver, and an updated version of Cheap Eats Vancouver. Their food and travel writing appeared in publications as diverse as Canada's National newspaper, the Globe and Mail, and Vancouver's award-winning The Georgia Straight. Garber and Keys were also commissioned to write the Vancouver section of the Bradman's Business Guide, and they wrote a regular international travel column for the Culver City News.

After a year-long fight with cancer, Garber died on July 17, 2011, while an in-patient at the B.C. Cancer Agency hospital.

Bibliography
 photographer: Garber, Anne; illustrator: Murphy, Nick.

 illustrator: Murphy, Nick.
 illustrator: Murphy, Dan.

 illustrator: Newland, Marv.

References

External links

Vacation ideas, travel guides, deals and articles | SoGoNow.com Travel Magazine
A step back in history to Paris's Musée de l'Armée By Anne Garber

1946 births
Canadian newspaper journalists
Canadian food writers
2011 deaths
Canadian women journalists
Women food writers
Restaurant critics
Women critics
20th-century Canadian non-fiction writers
20th-century Canadian women writers
Vancouver Sun people
The Globe and Mail people
Canadian columnists
Canadian women columnists
Deaths from cancer in British Columbia
Canadian women non-fiction writers